is a former Japanese football player and manager. His younger brother Yuji Okuma is also a former footballer.

Playing career
Okuma was born in Saitama on June 21, 1964. After graduating from Chuo University, he joined Tokyo Gas in 1987. He retired in 1992.

Coaching career
After retirement, Okuma became a coach at Tokyo Gas (later FC Tokyo) from 1994. In 1994, he managed as caretaker in 1994 Emperor's Cup. In 1995, he became a manager and managed until 2001. In 2002, he became a manager Japan U-20 national team. He managed at the 2003 and 2005 World Youth Championship. In July 2006, he became a coach for Japan national team under manager Ivica Osim and Takeshi Okada. After 2010 World Cup, he resigned. In September 2010, he returned to FC Tokyo and managed until 2011. From 2014, he managed Omiya Ardija (2014) and Cerezo Osaka (2015-2016).

Managerial statistics

Personal honors
As manager
AFC Coach of the Month - March 2000

Team honors
As manager
Japan Football League - 1998
J2 League - 2011
Emperor's Cup - 2011

References

External links

FC Tokyo

1964 births
Living people
Chuo University alumni
Association football people from Saitama Prefecture
Japanese footballers
Japan Soccer League players
Japan Football League (1992–1998) players
FC Tokyo players
Japanese football managers
J1 League managers
J2 League managers
FC Tokyo managers
Omiya Ardija managers
Cerezo Osaka managers
Association football defenders